Cos Life Hurts is the debut studio album by Australian pop-rock group Uncanny X-Men. Cos Life Hurts was released in June 1985 and sold over 100,000 copies in Australia. The album peaked at No. 3 in Australia and was certified 2× platinum.

Track listing

Charts

Weekly charts

Year-end charts

Certifications

References 

1985 debut albums
Mushroom Records albums
Uncanny X-Men (band) albums